The 1959–60 Bradford City A.F.C. season was the 47th in the club's history.

The club finished 19th in Division Three, and reached the 5th round of the FA Cup.

Sources

References

Bradford City A.F.C. seasons
Bradford City